Albert von Keller (27 April 1844 – 14 July 1920) was a German painter of Swiss ancestry. He specialized in portraits and indoor scenes. Female figures are a prominent feature of his work.

Biography 
Keller was born in Gais, Switzerland. He was one of eight children born to Caroline Keller, who was divorced at the time of his birth. As was customary, she had resumed the use of her maiden name. Her ex-husband's brother may have been his true father. When he was three, after several moves, the family settled in Bayreuth where he attended primary school and took piano lessons. In 1852, his mother became a citizen of Bavaria and, by extension, so did he. He graduated in 1863 and transferred to Ludwig Maximilian University to study law.

After 1865, he decided to pursue a career in art instead, but spent only a short time at the Academy of Fine Arts. He made numerous study trips throughout Germany, France, Italy and the Low Countries. From 1867 he worked at several different studios throughout Munich, including that of Arthur von Ramberg, where he drew nude studies.

In 1878, he married Irene von Eichthal (1858–1907), great-granddaughter of the Bavarian Court Banker, Aron Elias Seligmann, Freiherr von Eichthal. He would eventually paint over forty portraits of her. Their first son died as an infant. Their second son, Balthasar, was born in 1884, but died in 1906, shortly before his mother.

He exhibited at the Salon for the first time in 1883, while living in Paris. In 1886, he became a member of the new "Munich Psychological Society"; actually a group devoted to the paranormal, founded by Albert von Schrenck-Notzing. Soon he began representing parapsychological motifs, connected to Christian themes, with visions and hallucinations. In 1892, he was one of the co-founders of the Munich Secession and served as vice president from 1904 to 1920. He was also a board member of the Deutscher Künstlerbund. In 1898, he received the Knight's Cross of the Order of Merit of the Bavarian Crown, which entitled him to use the noble "von" in his name.

He died on 14 July 1920 in Munich. He and his wife Irene are interred at the Alter Südfriedhof there.

Selected paintings

References

Further reading 
 Hans Rosenhagen: Albert von Keller, Künstlermonographie 104, Velhagen & Klasing, Leipzig 1912 (133 Abb.).
 B. Rüttenauer: "Albert von Keller als Frauenmaler", in: Westermanns Monatshefte, #7, pgs.61–77, Leipzig 1913
 "Albert von Keller als Malerpsychologe und Metaphysiker", in: Psychische Studien, 48. April/May 1921, pgs.193–208 with photos by Schrenck-Notzing
 Oskar A. Müller: Albert von Keller 1844–1920. Das Ambiente eines Malers. Thiemig, München 1984, .
 Siegfried Weiß: Im Banne der Frauen – Albert von Keller (Ausst. Kunsthaus Kaufbeuren), in: Weltkunst, H. 10, 15. Mai 1997, S. 1053.
 Kunsthaus Zürich (Hrsg.): Albert von Keller. Salons, Séancen, Secession. Texte von Gian Casper Bott, Beitrag von Nico Kirchberger. München 2009, .

External links 

 
 
 
 
 Fritz von Ostini: Albert von Keller zu seinem 60. Geburtstag. In: Die Kunst für alle, 20. Jahrgang, Nr. 15 (1. Mai 1905), S. 345–353
 
 More works by Keller @ ArtNet

19th-century German painters
German male painters
20th-century German painters
20th-century German male artists
19th-century Swiss painters
Swiss male painters
20th-century Swiss painters
German untitled nobility
Swiss emigrants to Germany
1844 births
1920 deaths
Academic staff of the Academy of Fine Arts, Munich
19th-century painters of historical subjects
19th-century German male artists
19th-century Swiss male artists
20th-century Swiss male artists